Reticulohistiocytosis is a cutaneous condition of which there are two distinct forms:

 Reticulohistiocytoma
 Multicentric reticulohistiocytosis

See also 
 Non-X histiocytosis

References 

Monocyte- and macrophage-related cutaneous conditions